John Calvert (1726–1804), was an English brewer and politician who sat in the House of Commons for 48 years between 1754 and 1802.
 
Calvert was born on 6 May 1726 the son of Felix Calvert of Albury Hall and his wife Mary Calvert daughter of Felix Calvert of Nine Ashes, Hertfordshire who was his second cousin. The Calvert family were London brewers who owned the Peacock Brewhouse in Whitecross Street and the Hour Glass brewhouse in Thames Street.

Calvert was returned as Member of Parliament for Wendover by Lord Verney in a by-election on 25 February 1754 and was re-elected in the 1754 general election. His father died on 29 April 1755 and he inherited a partnership in the family business at the Peacock Brewery, Whitecross Street which he ran successfully for many years.

In 1761  Calvert was returned unopposed as MP for Hertford and again in 1774. He then lost his seat at Hertford in the 1780 general election but was returned by Lord Weymouth as MP for Tamworth in a by-election of November 1780. In 1784 he was returned again at  Hertford. He was elected there again in 1790 and headed the poll in 1796. He retired at the 1802 general election

Calvert died on 22 February 1804. He had married Elizabeth Hulse, daughter of Sir Edward Hulse, 1st Baronet on 8 September 1757 and had 2 sons. He was succeeded by his son John.

References

1726 births
1804 deaths
Members of the Parliament of Great Britain for English constituencies
British MPs 1754–1761
British MPs 1761–1768
British MPs 1768–1774
British MPs 1774–1780
British MPs 1780–1784
British MPs 1784–1790
British MPs 1790–1796
Members of the Parliament of the United Kingdom for English constituencies
UK MPs 1801–1802